Everywhere I Go may refer to:

"Everywhere I Go" (Amy Grant song)
"Everywhere I Go" (Hollywood Undead song)
"Everywhere I Go" (Phil Vassar song)
"Everywhere I Go", a song by Jackson Browne from I'm Alive
"Everywhere I Go", a song by The Call
"Everywhere I Go", a song by Junior Kimbrough, covered by the Black Keys from Thickfreakness
"Everywhere I Go", a song by Lissie from Catching a Tiger
"Everywhere I Go", a song by The Muffs from The Muffs
"Everywhere I Go", a song by Shawn Mullins
"Everywhere I Go", a song by Willie Nelson from Teatro
"Everywhere I Go (Kings & Queens)", a song by New Politics from Vikings
"Everywhere I Go", a song by Caitlin Rose from The Stand-In
"Everywhere I Go (Her Yerde Sen)", a Turkish drama series